Dardanelle may refer to:

Dardanelle Breckenbridge (1917-1997), American blues/jazz singer known by her stage name "Dardanelle"
Dardanelle, Arkansas, a city in Yell County, Arkansas, United States

See also
Dardanelles (disambiguation)